Malik Muzaffar Khan was a Pakistani politician and Nawab of Kalabagh. He was eldest son of Amir Mohammad Khan. He was   member of the 3rd National Assembly of Pakistan from NW-36 (Mianwali-I) and NW-43 (Sialkot). He was member of the 4th National Assembly of Pakistan from NW-37 (Mianwali). He also won in 1970 Pakistani general election as member national assembly from NW-44 (Mianwali-I)

See also 

 Kalabagh Dam

References

Further reading

 Siysat ke Firauns, (Pharaohs of Politics), by Wakil Anjam, Ferozsons Limited, 1992. p. 423–436

People from Mianwali District
Pakistani Sunni Muslims
Pakistani landowners
Punjabi people
Hashemite people
Alids
Awan
Alvis
Year of birth missing (living people)
Living people